XOBC is an EP by American singer-songwriter Brandi Carlile, released in February 2010 in the United States through Sony Music Entertainment via iTunes. The collection has a Valentine's Day theme and contains two cover songs (The Beatles' "All You Need Is Love" and Bryan Adams' "Heaven") along with three original tracks. Songs for the collection were recorded around Christmas following the release of her previous studio album Give Up the Ghost (2009).

In the United States, XOBC reached peak positions of number eighty on the Billboard 200, number thirteen on Billboard Top Digital Albums chart, number one on the Top Folk Albums chart and number eighteen on the Top Rock Albums chart.

Content
XOBC totals approximately fifteen minutes in length and contains five tracks, including cover versions of The Beatles' "All You Need Is Love" and Bryan Adams' "Heaven" and three original tracks.

Track listing

Chart performance
In the United States, XOBC reached peak positions of number eighty on the Billboard 200, number thirteen on Billboard Top Digital Albums chart, number one on the Top Folk Albums chart and number eighteen on the Top Rock Albums chart.

References

External links

XOBC on Brandi Carlile's official site
 XOBC at RCA Label Group (UK)
 

2010 EPs
Brandi Carlile albums
Pop rock EPs
Sony Music EPs